Eugen Gondi (b. 1947, in Timișoara) is a Romanian-born jazz drummer. 

He graduated from the Arts Middle School in his hometown.

He started his musical career by playing with the "Paul Weiner Free Jazz" trio.

He has played with many famous Romanian jazz players, like Marius Popp, Johnny Răducanu, Garbis Dedeian, Radu Goldiş, Pedro Negrescu, Dan Mândrilă, Jan Jankeje, Liviu Butoi. For a time, in 1974, he was the drummer of rock band Transsylvania Phoenix.

He is a former member of Mircea Florian's concept-band Ceata Melopoică.

He participated at several jazz festivals, such as the ones in Ploieşti, Sibiu, San Sebastián, Warsaw, Přerov, and Ljubliana.

After the Romanian Revolution of 1989, he emigrated to the Netherlands.

References

External links
 Eugen Gondi at Discogs
Interview with Eugen Gondi Part I 
Interview with Eugen Gondi Part II 

1947 births
Living people
Musicians from Timișoara
Romanian percussionists
Romanian drummers
Romanian emigrants to the Netherlands
Romanian jazz musicians